64 Aquarii is a star located 312 light years away from the Sun in the zodiac constellation of Aquarius. 64 Aquarii is its Flamsteed designation. With an apparent visual magnitude of 6.93, it is too faint to be readily visible to the naked eye. The star is moving further from the Earth with a heliocentric radial velocity of +11 km/s.

The stellar classification for this star is G2/3 IV/V, which indicates the spectrum displays mixed traits of a G-type main-sequence star and a more evolved subgiant star. It is 2.6 billion years old and is spinning with a projected rotational velocity of 8.75 km/s. The star has 1.45 times the mass of the Sun and 2.8 times the Sun's radius. It is radiating 13 times the luminosity of the Sun from its photosphere at an effective temperature of 5,926 K.

References

G-type main-sequence stars
G-type subgiants
Aquarius (constellation)
Durchmusterung objects
Aquarii, 064
214572
111843